The 2016–17 season was Milton Keynes Dons' 13th season in their existence, and was their first season back in League One, the third level of English football, following relegation from the Championship the previous season.

Along with competing in League One, the club also participated in the FA Cup, EFL Cup and EFL Trophy.

The season covered the period from 1 July 2016 to 30 June 2017.

Competitions

League One

Matches

Source: Sky Sports

FA Cup

Matches

EFL Cup

Matches

EFL Trophy

Southern Group F Table

'Matches

Player details
 Note: Players' ages as of the club's opening fixture of the 2016–17 season.

Transfers

Transfers in

Transfers out

Loans in

Loans out

References

External links

Official Supporters Association website
MK Dons news on MKWeb

Milton Keynes Dons
Milton Keynes Dons F.C. seasons